The Global Social Mobility Index is an index prepared by the World Economic Forum in the Global Social Mobility report. The Index measures the intergenerational social mobility in different countries in relation to socioeconomic outcomes. The inaugural index ranked 82 countries.

Methodology 
The Index is grounded on the following five factors:

Health

 Overall

Education

 Education access
 Education quality and equity
 Lifelong learning

Technology

 Technology access

Work

 Work opportunities
 Fair wage distribution
 Working conditions

Resilience & Institutions

 Social protection
 Inclusive institutions

Global Social Mobility Index (2020) 

List of countries ranked by their score in the Global Social Mobility Index 2020. The value 100 was the best possible score a country could reach.

Weblinks 

 Global Social Mobility Report 2020

References 

Economic indicators